Glasgow Citybus was a bus company operating services across Glasgow and Dunbartonshire. It was a subsidiary of West Coast Motors.

History
Glasgow Citybus was formed in November 1999, by Russell Arden. The company was acquired by Campbeltown-based West Coast Motors in January 2006.

Under the ownership of West Coast Motors, the company went on to acquire Glasgow's City Sightseeing franchise in January 2008, John Morrow Coaches of Clydebank in March 2012, and Fairline Coaches in November 2013.

Between February and May 2012, Glasgow Citybus received an order of fifteen brand new Alexander Dennis Enviro 200 vehicles – at a cost of £1.8 million. This investment saw the average age of the fleet, at the time, reduced to just two years old.

In April 2015, the company was awarded the contract to operate the 398 shuttle service, on behalf of Abellio ScotRail, connecting Glasgow Central and Glasgow Queen Street. The service is currently operated by Alexander Dennis Enviro 200 MMCs, branded in a dark blue livery, with Abellio Scotrail branding.

On January the 31st, 2023, the company was absorbed into West Coast Motors, and the name Glasgow Citybus was dropped.

Fleet and operations
The Glasgow Citybus fleet consists mainly of vehicles manufactured by Alexander Dennis. , the company operates from a single depot, which is located on South Street in Glasgow.

Livery and branding
Originally, vehicles were branded in a red and yellow livery, which featured a blue and red diagonal stripe. The livery and logo was updated in 2017, to a style similar to that of parent company, West Coast Motors. Vehicles are now branded in a cream and red livery, with a blue stripe along the length of the vehicle.

See also
 West Coast Motors

References

External links
Glasgow Citybus company website
Images of Glasgow Citybus

Transport in Glasgow
Bus operators in Scotland